Transpetrol may refer to:

 Transpetrol AS, Slovakian oil pipeline operator
 Transpetrol Limited, Belgium based maritime company specialising in oil tankers
 , European rail transport company